Ephraim Fajutagana y Servañez is a former Obispo Máximo or Supreme Bishop of the Philippine Independent Church (Iglesia Filipina Independiente or IFI). He is the 12th Obispo Máximo, the highest post of the Church, that goes back from its first and co-founder Gregorio Aglipay.

Delegates to the 12th Triennial General Assembly of the Iglesia Filipina Independiente unanimously voted into office as Obispo Máximo the Church's former General Secretary, the Rt. Rev. Ephraim S. Fajutagana, on 10 May 2011. Bishop Fajutagana, from the Diocese of Romblon and Mindoros, bested two aspirants from Mindanao: Bishop Rhee Timbang (Diocese of Surigao) and Bishop Felixberto Calang (Diocese of Misamis Occidental, Bukidnon and Camiguin).

Bishop Fajutagana has been in ministry since 1977, having served the Iglesia Filipina Independiente for a total of some thirty four (34) years before his election to the highest office of the Church. He was ordained to the priesthood the same year after graduating from Saint Andrew's Theological Seminary in 1977 where he obtained his Bachelor of Theology degree. Bishop Fajutagana was consecrated to the episcopate in July 2002 and served the Diocese of Cavite as Diocesan Bishop until his election as General Secretary in May 2005, and then eventually as Supreme Bishop in May 2011. During his term, he was also concurrently the chairperson of the National Council of Churches in the Philippines. 

In 2015, Fajutagana met and had an inter-religious dialogue with Pope Francis at the University of Santo Tomas during the latter's state visit to the Philippines.

He was succeeded by Rhee Timbang as the Supreme Bishop in May 2017 after six years of tenure.

Fajutagana was also the former chairperson of Workers Assistance Center, Inc. (WAC), a non-government organization.

Personal life
Fajutagana was born and hailed in Odiongan, Romblon to Ángel Fajutagana y Forca (b. 3 October 1919) and Felicidad Servañez y Formon (b. 13 December 1919). He is first cousin once removed to Odiongan SB member Rolando Forca being the first cousin of his father, Ángel. Fajutagana is a member of the Freemasonry's Grand Lodge of the Philippines.

References

1951 births
Living people
Filipino Christian religious leaders
Filipino bishops
Members of the Philippine Independent Church
Bishops of Independent Catholic denominations
Anglo-Catholic bishops
Anglo-Catholic clergy
People from Romblon
Filipino Freemasons